Horton is an unincorporated community in Lane County, Oregon, United States. It is about three miles northeast of Blachly, in the Lake Creek valley of the Central Oregon Coast Range .

In 1903, three brothers—E. J. Horton, Sam M. Horton, and J. C. Horton—settled in the area and started a sawmill they named Horton Mill. When the post office was established in 1913 it was named after the family. Sam Horton was the first postmaster; the office closed in 1960.

Horton's economy was based on the lumber and dairy industries. In 1915 Horton had a public school, two churches and two fraternal lodges.

References

Unincorporated communities in Lane County, Oregon
1913 establishments in Oregon
Unincorporated communities in Oregon